Tow Law railway station served the town of Tow Law, County Durham, England, from 1847 to 1965 on the Stanhope and Tyne Railway.

History 
The first station opened in September 1847 by the North Eastern Railway. It was situated on the west side of High Street. It was resited on 2 March 1868 in between Station Road and Church Lane when the Sunnyside deviation opened, although the first site remained for goods traffic. Six blast furnaces were built and served by nearby collieries. Atwood Iron Works closed in 1882 but more iron works opened up around the town. The station building was on the down side and the signal box was at the west end of the up platform. This controlled access to the goods yard which was to the west of the station. On the down side of the goods yard were four sidings, the northernmost siding serving a stone goods shed and the southernmost siding passing  the cattle dock. Private sidings served various collieries, gas works, iron works and depots. The station lost passenger traffic, albeit not much, when the section of the line to  closed on 1 May 1939. The line closed completely around 1951 and Tow Law became a terminus for  services, although this didn't last for long. Passenger services were withdrawn on 11 June 1956 and goods traffic ceased for both stations on 5 July 1965. The track was lifted from 1966–1967 and it was demolished in 1973. The site is now occupied by Alpine Way housing.

References

External links 

Disused railway stations in County Durham
Former North Eastern Railway (UK) stations
Railway stations opened in 1847
Railway stations closed in 1956
1847 establishments in England
1965 disestablishments in England

Railway stations in Great Britain opened in 1847